Simon Wiesenthal, KBE (December 31, 1908September 20, 2005) was an Austrian Holocaust survivor who became famous after World War II for his work as a Nazi hunter. He was presented with many awards, merits, and honorary doctorates over the course of his life.

State awards

Local government honors

Organisations

Academic institutions

Wiesenthal was awarded 18 honorary doctorates from universities around the world, including seven faculties of law.
 Honorary member of the University of Applied Arts Vienna, 1989
 Honorary Member of the Academy of Science, Ljubljana, Slovenia, 1994
 Human Rights Award of the Karl Franzens University, Graz, Austria, 1994
 Honorary Doctorate from the Jagiellonian University in Kraków; 1994
 Honorary doctorate from the Ben-Gurion University of the Negev in Beersheba, Israel

References

Wiesenthal
Awards